Pukarua Airport  is serving the village of Marautagaroa, located on the Pukarua atoll, in the Tuamotu group of atolls in French Polynesia, at  from Tahiti.

Airlines and destinations

Passenger
No scheduled flights as of May 2019.

References

External links
 Atoll list (in French)
 Classification of the French Polynesian atolls by Salvat (1985)

Airports in French Polynesia
Atolls of the Tuamotus